The 2013 Sarasota Open was a professional tennis tournament played on clay courts. It was the fifth edition of the tournament which was part of the 2013 ATP Challenger Tour. It took place in Sarasota, Florida, United States between 13 and 21 April 2013.

Singles main draw entrants

Seeds

 1 Rankings are as of April 8, 2013.

Other entrants
The following players received wildcards into the singles main draw:
  Kyle Edmund
  Mitchell Frank
  Bjorn Fratangelo
  Tennys Sandgren

The following players received entry as an alternate into the singles main draw:
  Somdev Devvarman
  Bradley Klahn
  Denys Molchanov

The following players received entry from the qualifying draw:
  Ilija Bozoljac
  Jeong Suk-Young
  Alex Kuznetsov
  Lim Yong-Kyu

Doubles main draw entrants

Seeds

1 Rankings as of April 8, 2013.

Other entrants
The following pairs received wildcards into the doubles main draw:
  Terrell Celestine /  Siddhartha Chappidi
  Bjorn Fratangelo /  Mitchell Krueger
  Alex Kuznetsov /  Mischa Zverev

The following pairs received entry from the qualifying draw:
  Ilija Bozoljac /  Somdev Devvarman

Champions

Singles

 Alex Kuznetsov def.  Wayne Odesnik, 6–0, 6–2

Doubles

 Ilija Bozoljac /  Somdev Devvarman def.  Steve Johnson /  Bradley Klahn, 6–7(5–7), 7–6(7–3), [11–9]

External links
Official Website

Sarasota Open
Sarasota Open
Sarasota Open
2013 in American tennis
2013 in sports in Florida